Percy Montague Rees (September 27, 1883 — June 12, 1970), was a field hockey player, who won a gold medal with the Great Britain team at the 1908 Summer Olympics in London, England.

In 1906, Rees made his first appearance for the England national field hockey team against Wales and played Ireland and Scotland in the same year. In 1908 Rees was selected to play for the South vs Midlands and later the North. He was then selected to play for England vs. Wales, Ireland and Scotland and also played against France. He was part of the Olympic squad that won the gold medal for England in 1908.

References

External links
 

1883 births
1970 deaths
English male field hockey players
English Olympic medallists
Field hockey players at the 1908 Summer Olympics
Olympic gold medallists for Great Britain
Olympic field hockey players of Great Britain
British male field hockey players
Olympic medalists in field hockey
People educated at Dulwich College
Medalists at the 1908 Summer Olympics